Narharidas Barhath (नरहरिदास बारहठ) was a famous Rajasthani poet of the medieval era. He was born in a Charan family of the Indian state Rajasthan.

He was born in 1648 at Tehla village in Merta pargana of Marwar. His father Lakhaji Barhath, was a renowned poet of the 16th century in India. He was in the court of Jodhpur State king Gaj Singh I. He died there in about 1733.
He has written famous Avtar Charitra. He had convinced Shah Jahan for banning cow slaughter in Mughal empire.

Further reading 

 Lakhawat, Onkar Singh (2003). Bārahaṭha Naraharidāsa (in Hindi). Sāhitya Akādemī. .

References 

 Truth of Ramsetu

Indian male poets
Rajasthani-language writers
1648 births
1733 deaths
People from Jodhpur
Poets from Rajasthan
17th-century Indian poets
18th-century Indian poets
18th-century male writers
17th-century male writers
Charan
Dingal poets